KFTG (88.1 FM) is a radio station broadcasting a Spanish Religious format. Licensed to Pasadena, Texas, United States, it serves the Houston area.  The station is currently owned by Aleluya Christian Broadcasting, Inc.

KFTG rebroadcasts its programming on co-channel 88.1 K201EU to expand coverage into Katy and west Houston, and K201DZ to expand coverage on to Galveston Island, where KFTG's main signal reception is marginal or non-existent.

External links
 
 
 
 
 
 
 

Radio stations established in 1982
1982 establishments in Texas
FTG
FTG
Pasadena, Texas